Michael Marder is Ikerbasque Research Professor of Philosophy at the University of the Basque Country, Vitoria-Gasteiz. He works in the phenomenological tradition of Continental philosophy, environmental thought, and political philosophy.

Education
Marder studied at universities in Canada and the U.S. He received his PhD in Philosophy at the New School for Social Research in New York City. Marder carried out post-doctoral research in the Department of Philosophy at the University of Toronto, and taught at Georgetown University, George Washington University, and St. Thomas More College at the University of Saskatchewan.

Career
Marder carried out research in phenomenology as an FCT fellow at the University of Lisbon, Portugal, and held the position of Assistant Professor in the Department of Philosophy at Duquesne University in Pittsburgh. before accepting the Ikerbasque research professorship at the University of the Basque Country.

Marder is an editorial associate of the Journal Telos (New York) and an editor of four-book series: "Political Theory and Contemporary Philosophy" Series, "Critical Plant Studies", "Future Perfect: Images of the Time to Come in Philosophy, Politics, and Cultural Studies", and "Palgrave Studies in Postmetaphysical Thought.

Much of his philosophical work has focused on building philosophies that take into account plants as beings with their own form of subjectivity, which has included showing how the field of philosophy, especially the tradition of continental philosophy, has neglected plants or treated them as "other", and how the field has been poorer for it. Dominic Pettman found Marder's book Plant-Thinking to be a work that made a substantial contribution to that nascent field, but also at times too simplistic, for example idealizing the ways that plants co-exist with other beings and not taking into account the ways that plants attack and defend against other beings.

Bibliography

References

External links
 MichaelMarder.org - Marder's webpage

21st-century Spanish philosophers
Basque philosophers
Continental philosophers
Environmental philosophers
Ecologists
Heidegger scholars
Phenomenologists
Philosophers of biology
Political philosophers
Academic staff of the University of the Basque Country
Living people
1980 births
Carl Schmitt scholars